Felt is an American hip hop duo, consisting of Slug of Atmosphere and Murs of Living Legends.

History
Slug and Murs first met at First Avenue in Minneapolis, Minnesota. Subsequently, the two started making music together and formed Felt.

Felt released the debut studio album, Felt: A Tribute to Christina Ricci, in 2002. It was produced by Murs' fellow Living Legends member The Grouch.

In 2005, the duo released the second studio album, Felt 2: A Tribute to Lisa Bonet. It was produced by Ant of Atmosphere.

In 2009, the duo released the third studio album, Felt 3: A Tribute to Rosie Perez. It was produced by Aesop Rock.

In 2020, Felt returned with a single, "Name in Ya Mouth". In that year, the duo released the fourth studio album, Felt 4 U. Produced by Ant, the album featured guest appearances from Blimes, Aesop Rock, The Grouch, and Shepard Albertson.

Discography

Studio albums
 Felt: A Tribute to Christina Ricci (2002)
 Felt 2: A Tribute to Lisa Bonet (2005)
 Felt 3: A Tribute to Rosie Perez (2009)
 Felt 4 U (2020)

Singles
 "Dirty Girl" (2005)
 "Name in Ya Mouth" (2020)

References

External links
 Felt at Rhymesayers Entertainment
 

American hip hop groups
American musical duos
Hip hop duos
Rhymesayers Entertainment artists